Fred Allen "Rabbi" Robins (December 17, 1890 – ?) was an American football and baseball coach at both Mercer and Mississippi. He served as the head football coach at Mercer University in 1914 prior to accepting the head coaching position with the University of Mississippi in May 1915. While at Mississippi, Robbins compiled a record of 5–12. He played for coach Dan McGugin's Vanderbilt teams. His skills better suited to the mud, he played quarterback and led the team to its largest win in its history, a 105 to 0 win over Bethel in 1912.

Head coaching record

Football

References

1890 births
Year of death missing
American football halfbacks
American football quarterbacks
Ole Miss Rebels baseball coaches
Ole Miss Rebels football coaches
Mercer Bears football coaches
Mercer Bears baseball coaches
Vanderbilt Commodores football players
Sportspeople from Tupelo, Mississippi